Buydens is a surname. Notable people with the surname include:

Albert Buydens (1905–?), Belgian swimmer, competitor at the 1924 Summer Olympics
Anne Buydens (1919–2021), German-born Belgian-American philanthropist, producer, and actress
Hubert Buydens (born 1982), Canadian rugby union player